The Greens Party of Georgia is a political party in Georgia. It is led by Gia (Giorgi) Gachechiladze.

Its success has varied - having 11 out of 235 members of parliament in 1992 and having been part of the governing coalition in 1995. When it stood independently in 1999 it only received 0.55% of the vote. It stood as part of Eduard Shevardnadze's coalition in the annulled 2003 elections.

In 2012 the party joined the Georgian Dream coalition, electing 6 MPs at the 2012 election and at the 2016 election.

The party is a member of the European Green Party and of the Global Greens.

Results in elections

Parliamentary election

See also

Green party
Green politics
List of political parties in Georgia

External links

Official homepage

1989 establishments in Georgia (country)
Centrist parties in Asia
Centrist parties in Europe
European Green Party
Global Greens member parties
Green conservative parties
Green parties in Asia
Green parties in Europe
Political parties established in 1989
Political parties in Georgia (country)
Political parties in the Soviet Union